Quadrigyridae is the only family within Gyracanthocephala, an order of parasitic worms of class Eoacanthocephala. This family contains two subfamilies, ten genera and about 92 species.

Species
Species in Quadrigyridae are divided into two subfamilies: Pallisentinae Van Cleave, 1928 with five genera and Quadrigyrinae Van Cleave, 1920 with three.

Pallisentinae Van Cleave, 1928
Acanthogyrus Thapar, 1927

Golvan in 1959 divided the genus Acanthogyrus into two subgenera: Acanthogyrus and Acanthosentis based on the number of proboscis hooks; there are 18 (3 circles of 6 hooks each) in Acanthosentis and 24 (3 circles of 8 hooks each) in Acanthogyrus.

Acanthogyrus (Acanthogyrus) Thapar, 1927

 Acanthogyrus acanthogyrus Thapar, 1927

Found in the intestine of a rohu (Labeo rohita) in Lucknow, and from the intestines of a catla (Catla catla) from Kolkata, both in India.

 Acanthogyrus tripathi Rai, 1967

Acanthogyrus (Acanthosentis) Verma and Datta, 1929

 Acanthogyrus acanthuri (Cable and Quick, 1954)
 Acanthogyrus adriaticus Amin, 2005
 Acanthogyrus alternatspinus Amin, 2005
 Acanthogyrus anguillae (Wang, 1981)
 Acanthogyrus antespinus (Verma and Datta, 1929)
 Acanthogyrus arii (Bilqees, 1971)
 Acanthogyrus bacailai (Verma, 1973)
 Acanthogyrus barmeshoori Amin, Gholami, Akhlaghi and Heckmann, 2013

A. barmeshoori was found infesting Aphanius farsicus in Maharlou Lake, Fars Province, Iran.

 Acanthogyrus betwai (Tripathi, 1956)
 Acanthogyrus bilaspurensis (Chowhan, Gupta and Khera, 1987)
 Acanthogyrus cameroni (Gupta and Kajaji, 1969)
 Acanthogyrus cheni Amin, 2005
 Acanthogyrus dattai (Podder, 1938)
 Acanthogyrus giuris (Soota and Sen, 1956)
 Acanthogyrus gobindi (Chowhan, Gupta and Khera, 1987)
 Acanthogyrus golvani (Gupta and Jain, 1980)
 Acanthogyrus heterospinus (Khan and Bilqees, 1990)
 Acanthogyrus holospinus (Sen, 1937)
 Acanthogyrus indicus (Tripathi, 1959)
 Acanthogyrus intermedius (Achmerov and Dombrovskaja-Achmerova, 1941)
 Acanthogyrus lizae (Wang, 1986)
 Acanthogyrus malawiensis Amin and Hendrix, 1999	 
 Acanthogyrus maroccanus (Dollfus, 1951)
 Acanthogyrus multispinus Wang, 1966
 Acanthogyrus nigeriensis Dollfus and Golvan, 1956
 Acanthogyrus papilo Troncy and Vassiliades, 1974
 Acanthogyrus parareceptaclis Amin, 2005 
 Acanthogyrus partispinus (Furtado, 1963)
 Acanthogyrus paucispinus Wang, 1966
 Acanthogyrus periophthalmi (Wang, 1980)
 Acanthogyrus phillipi (Mashego, 1988)
 Acanthogyrus putitorae (Chowhan, Gupta and Khera, 1988)
 Acanthogyrus scomberomori (Wang, 1980)
 Acanthogyrus seenghalae (Chowhan, Gupta and Khera, 1988)
 Acanthogyrus shashiensis (Tso, Chen, and Chien, 1974)
 Acanthogyrus shuklai (Agrawal and Singh, 1982)
 Acanthogyrus siamensis (Farooqi and Sirikanchana, 1987)	 
 Acanthogyrus similis (Wang, 1980)
 Acanthogyrus sircari (Podder, 1941)
 Acanthogyrus thapari (Parasad, Sahay and Shambhunath, 1969)
 Acanthogyrus tilapiae (Baylis, 1948) 
 Acanthogyrus vancleavei (Gupta and Fatma, 1986)
 Acanthogyrus vittatusi (Verma, 1973)

Palliolisentis Machado-Filho, 1960

 Palliolisentis ornatus Machado-Filho, 1960
 Palliolisentis polyonca Schmidt and Hugghins, 1973
 Palliolisentis quinqueungulis Machado-Filho, 1960

Pallisentis Van Cleave, 1928

 Pallisentis channai Gupta, Maurya and Saxena, 2015
 Pallisentis vinodai Gupta, Maurya and Saxena, 2015
 Pallisentis (Brevitritospinus) Amin, Heckmann, Ha, Luc and Doanh, 2000
 Pallisentis allahabadii Agarwal, 1958
 Pallisentis cavasii Gupta and Verma, 1980
 Pallisentis croftoni Mital and Lal, 1981
 Pallisentis fasciati Gupta and Verma, 1980
 Pallisentis fotedari Gupta and Sinha, 1991
 Pallisentis guntei Sahay, Nath, and Sinha, 1967
 Pallisentis indica Mital and Lal, 1981
 Pallisentis mehrai Gupta and Fatma, 1986 
 Pallisentis vietnamensis Amin, Heckmann, Ha, Luc and Doanh, 2000
 Pallisentis (Demidueterospinus) Amin, Heckmann, Ha, Luc and Doanh, 2000
 Pallisentis basiri Farooqi, 1958
 Pallisentis ophiocephali (Thapar, 1931)
 Pallisentis (Pallisentis) Van Cleave, 1928
 Pallisentis celatus (Van Cleave, 1928)
 Pallisentis cholodkowskyi (Kostylev, 1928)
 Pallisentis chongqingensis Liu and Zhang, 1993
 Pallisentis clupei Gupta and Gupta, 1980
 Pallisentis colisai Sarkar, 1956
 Pallisentis gaboes (Maccallum, 1918)
 Pallisentis garuai (Sahay, Sinha and Ghosh, 1971)
 Pallisentis gomtii Gupta and Verma, 1980
 Pallisentis guptai Gupta and Fatma, 1986
 Pallisentis jagani Koul, Raina, Bambroo and Koul, 1992
 Pallisentis kalriai Khan and Bilqees, 1985
 Pallisentis magnum Saeed and Bilgees, 1971
 Pallisentis nagpurensis' (Bhalerao, 1931)
 Pallisentis nandai Sarkar, 1953
 Pallisentis pesteri (Tadros, 1966)
 Pallisentis rexus Wongkham and Whitfield, 1999
 Pallisentis singaporensis Khan and Ip, 1988

P. singaporensis has 8 to 12 proboscis hooks per circle, gradually declining in size posteriorly. They measure from the anterior are 62 to 64, 49 to 54, 36 to 46 and 24 to 28 um long. The trunk spines are conical and do not extend to the posterior end in 25 or 26 circles, each with 10 spines. In the male, the cement gland is long and has 23 to 25 giant nuclei and lack Saefftigen's pouch. They have unequal lemnisci. The female gonopore is terminal.

 Pallisentis sindensis Khan and Bilqees, 1987	
 Pallisentis umbellatus Van Cleave, 1928
 Pallisentis ussuriensis (Kostylev, 1941)

Pararaosentis Amin, Heckmann, Ha, Luc and Doanh, 2000

 Pararaosentis golvani (Troncy and Vassiliades, 1973)

Raosentis Datta, 1947

 Raosentis dattai Gupta and Fatma, 1986
 Raosentis godavarensis Vankara and Vijayalakshmi, 2009	 
 Raosentis ivaniosi George and Nadakal, 1978
 Raosentis podderi Datta, 1947
 Raosentis thapari Rai, 1967

Triaspiron Smales, Aydogdu and Emre, 2012

 Triaspiron aphanii Smales, Aydogdu and Emre, 2012

Quadrigyrinae Van Cleave, 1920

Acanthodelta Diaz-Ungria and Gracia-Rodrigo, 1958

Acanthodelta scorzai (Diaz-Ungria and Gracia-Rodrigo, 1957)

Machadosentis Noronha, 1992

Machadosentis travassosi Noronha, 1992

Quadrigyrus Van Cleave, 1920

 Quadrigyrus brasiliensis Machado-Filho, 1941
 Quadrigyrus chinensis Mao, 1979
 Quadrigyrus guptai Gupta and Gunjan-Sinh, 1992
 Quadrigyrus machadoi Fabio, 1983
 Quadrigyrus nickoli Schmidt and Hugghins, 1973

Q. nickoli was found infesting Hoplerythrinus unitaeniatus from Colombia. It has four circular rows of between 23 and 29 trunk spines each with heavy dendritic roots. The species name nickoli is named after Dr. Brent B. Nickol, a parasitologist from the University of Nebraska.

 Quadrigyrus polyspinosus Li, 1984
 Quadrigyrus rhodei Wang, 1980
 Quadrigyrus simhai Gupta and Fatma, 1986
 Quadrigyrus torquatus Van Cleave, 1920

Q. torquatus has been found infesting the intestines of Ageneiosus caucanus and Hoplias malabaricus in the Magdalena River basin in Colombia. It was also found in Hoplerythrinus unitaeniatus also from Colombia.

Hosts
Quadrigyridae species parasitize fish.

Notes

References

 

Eoacanthocephala
Acanthocephala families